George Holland may refer to

George Holland (actor) (1791–1870), stage actor
George Holland (tennis), Australian tennis player
George Calvert Holland (1801–1865), English physician
George H. Holland, public official in Mississippi